Dimosthenis Stamboulis (20 October 1924 – 16 July 2009) was a Greek water polo player. He competed in the men's tournament at the 1948 Summer Olympics.

References

External links
 

1924 births
2009 deaths
Greek male water polo players
Olympic water polo players of Greece
Water polo players at the 1948 Summer Olympics
Place of birth missing
Water polo players from Patras